Delporte may refer to:

Eugène Joseph Delporte (1882–1955), Belgian astronomer
Yvan Delporte (1928–2007), Belgian comics writer and editor
Ludovic Delporte (born 1980), French footballer
Julie Delporte (born 1983), Canadian cartoonist and illustrator
Delporte (crater), a lunar impact crater